This is a list of common β-lactam antibiotics—both administered drugs and those not in clinical use—organized by structural class. Antibiotics are listed alphabetically within their class or subclass by their nonproprietary name. If an antibiotic is a combination drug, both ingredients will be listed.

Penams

Narrow-spectrum

β-lactamase-sensitive

Benzathine
benzylpenicillin (Penicillin G)
Benzathine penicillin G
Benzathine penicillin V
Phenoxymethylpenicillin (penicillin V)
Procaine penicillin 
Pheneticillin

β-lactamase-resistant

Cloxacillin
Dicloxacillin
Flucloxacillin
Methicillin
Nafcillin
Oxacillin
Temocillin

Broad spectrum

Amoxicillin
Ampicillin

Extended spectrum (Antipseudomonal)

Mecillinam
Piperacillin
Carbenicillin
Ticarcillin

Carboxypenicillins

Carbenicillin
Ticarcillin

Ureidopenicillins

Azlocillin
Mezlocillin
Piperacillin

Cephems

First generation (moderate spectrum)

Cefazolin
Cephalexin
Cephalosporin C
Cephalothin
Cefapirin

Second generation (moderate spectrum)
cefuroxime, cefaclor, cefprozil

With anti-Haemophilus activity

Cefaclor
Cefamandole
Cefuroxime

With anti-anaerobic activity

Cefotetan
Cefoxitin

Third generation (broad spectrum)

Cefixime
Cefotaxime
Cefpodoxime
Ceftazidime
Ceftriaxone
Cefdinir

Fourth generation (broad spectrum)
(With β-lactamase stability and enhanced activity against Gram-positive bacteria and Pseudomonas aeruginosa)

Cefepime
Cefpirome

Fifth generation* (broad spectrum)
(activity against MRSA and variably VRE. *Not universally accepted nomenclature. NO Antipseudomonal activity, mostly ceftriaxone coverage with additional MRSA and some VRE)

Ceftaroline, Ceftobiprole

Carbapenems and penems
(Broadest spectrum of β-lactam antibiotics)

Biapenem
Doripenem
Ertapenem
Faropenem
Imipenem
Meropenem
Panipenem
Razupenem
Tebipenem
Thienamycin

Monobactams

Aztreonam
Tigemonam
Nocardicin A
Tabtoxinine β-lactam (does not inhibit penicillin-binding proteins)

β-lactamase inhibitors

Clavulanic acid
Tazobactam
Sulbactam
Avibactam

Beta-lactam antibiotics
Beta-lactam antibiotics